The 2013 AFL Grand Final was an Australian rules football game contested between Hawthorn Football Club and Fremantle Football Club at the Melbourne Cricket Ground on 28 September 2013. It was the 118th annual grand final of the Australian Football League (formerly the Victorian Football League), staged to determine the premiers for the 2013 AFL season. The match, attended by 100,007 spectators, was won by Hawthorn by a margin of 15 points, marking the club's eleventh VFL/AFL premiership victory. Hawthorn's Brian Lake was awarded the Norm Smith Medal as the best player on the ground.

Background

The club's only other loss came against  in Round 19, and it finished with a record of 19–3 to win the minor premiership for the second consecutive year. They defeated Sydney in the qualifying final by 54 points and earned a week off. They ended an 11-match losing streak against Geelong since the 2008 AFL Grand Final to win by five points in the preliminary final. The match was Hawthorn's third grand final appearance in six years.

Fremantle recorded its largest ever victory when they defeated  in Round 20, then, with a finals berth guaranteed, Ross Lyon rested half of his regular side ahead of its final regular season match against ; the result was a 71-point defeat, which marked the worst defeat in Lyon's coaching career. The team finished third at the end of the home-and-away season, and compiled a club-best record of 16–5–1. They unexpectedly defeated  in Geelong by 15 points in the first week of the finals, which earned them a week off and a home preliminary final. Fremantle defeated the reigning premiers, Sydney, by 25 points in the preliminary final. The match was Fremantle's first grand final in its history.

The two teams met once during the regular season, in Round 4 at Aurora Stadium; Hawthorn won by 42 points.

Media Coverage
The match was televised by the Seven Network. The primary match commentary was provided by Bruce McAvaney and Dennis Cometti.

Pre-match entertainment
Two Australian bands, Birds of Tokyo and Hunters & Collectors performed before the game and at half time, respectively. The Australian national anthem was sung by Tina Arena.

Match summary

First quarter
Fremantle won the coin toss and chose to kick towards the City End of the MCG in the first quarter. However, it was Hawthorn who got off to a good start, with Jack Gunston kicking the first goal before Lance Franklin kicked the Hawks' second after Luke McPharlin gave away a 50-metre penalty for stepping over the mark. Hawthorn then had a few chances to extend their margin, however a rushed behind and missed opportunities by Shaun Burgoyne and Isaac Smith, had little influence on the scoreboard. Meanwhile, Fremantle were held goalless in the opening quarter with Hayden Ballantyne and Nick Suban missing relatively easy shots on goal whilst Nathan Fyfe missed two shots completely with both going out on the full. At quarter time, the Hawks had a 12-point lead.

Second quarter
Hawthorn started off the quarter strongly, taking a stranglehold of the game against the Dockers. Jack Gunston kicked his second goal on the run from just inside 50 before Cyril Rioli through his manic forward pressure, got himself on the board after catching Lee Spurr for holding the ball, taking the Hawks to a massive 24-point lead. Finally at the 12-minute mark, Tendai Mzungu kicked the Dockers' first goal, before Ryan Crowley kicked yet another behind for Fremantle. This was quickly followed by Jack Gunston slotting his third goal after outpositioning Fremantle's Zac Dawson. The two teams then exchanged behinds with Rioli and Brad Sewell for Hawthorn and Matthew Pavlich and Nat Fyfe for Fremantle all registering minor scores as Hawthorn enjoyed a 23-point lead at half time. Fremantle's first half score of 1.6 (12) was the lowest in a grand final since 1960.

Third quarter
After failing to capitalise on their chances in the first half, Fremantle began a comeback in the third quarter. Within a minute, Fremantle captain Matthew Pavlich kicked his first goal, however this was later cancelled out by a goal to Jarryd Roughead. This was followed by 3 goals in succession to Fremantle with goals to Pavlich, Michael Walters, a massive 55-metre set shot bomb from Chris Mayne and a behind from David Mundy to take the Dockers within 3 points of the Hawks. The Hawks tried to respond with a flurry of their own, however missed opportunities to Roughead and Cyril Rioli only made little difference to the margin. Roughead later managed to kick his second goal after he was pushed in the back, but Fremantle replied as behinds to Stephen Hill and Michael Barlow and Walters kicking his second goal once again allowed them to close within 3 points. Moments later, Hawthorn replied again as Jack Gunston kicked his fourth goal. Gunston then has another opportunity through a set shot but misses it to the right as the Hawks entered the three-quarter-time break ten points ahead.

Final quarter
As much as the majority of the 3rd quarter was dominated by Fremantle, the first half of the fourth quarter was dominated by the Hawks as they booted 3 unanswered goals to take themselves to a match winning 31-point lead. Jarryd Roughead missed a shot with his snap going wide before Isaac Smith slotted a massive goal from a set shot 55 metres out in similar fashion to Chris Mayne's goal in the third quarter. Additional goals to Luke Breust and Bradley Hill and behinds from Roughead and Lance Franklin put the result beyond doubt, stretching their lead to 31 points. During Hawthorn's period of dominance, Brian Lake, a recently recruited defender from the Western Bulldogs, was instrumental in shutting down Fremantle's attacks, taking two critical contested marks from opposing kicks to help his team to victory. Fremantle tried to make a final comeback with two late goals to Danyle Pearce and Matthew Pavlich to give the Dockers some hope. However, the Dockers' inability on the day to convert their opportunities was summed up as Hayden Ballantyne and Pavlich missed two crucial shots on goal, whereas another opportunity was rushed through for a behind. Fremantle then had one last opportunity to get themselves back into the game. With 90 seconds remaining, Ryan Crowley had a running shot on goal in an open paddock which would’ve bought the Dockers to within 2 kicks of the Hawks, however, he was run down and tackled by Ben Stratton, with the ensuing kick missing to the right. Hawthorn were then able to hold on to win the grand final by 15 points, avenging their grand final loss the previous year.

Overall report

Hawthorn led the match from start to finish but were outplayed for significant periods. It is the only grand final which Champion Data have assessed as having been won by the poorer side on the day, as Fremantle were left to rue their opportunities they were unable to convert.

2013 remains the only time the Fremantle Dockers have appeared in an AFL Grand Final since joining the league in 1995 (and hence the closest they have come to an AFL Premiership). Two years later, in 2015, Fremantle won the minor premiership for finishing on top of the AFL ladder at the end of the home & away season, but they failed to convert that achievement into another grand final appearance, losing to Hawthorn in the Preliminary Final.

Norm Smith Medal

Brian Lake took ten marks of which seven were intercept marks to repel the Dockers attack. He took two crucial marks in the final quarter which sealed his Norm Smith Medal win. Lake finished with 12 votes, just edging out teammate Jack Gunston with 11 votes who was also crucial on the day with his straight kicking, booting 4 goals. David Mundy polled 4 votes, while Luke Hodge and Nat Fyfe polled 2 and 1 votes respectively. Lake subsequently accepted a four match suspension for deliberately elbowing opponent Michael Walters in the jaw during the third quarter, making him the first Norm Smith Medalist to have committed a reportable offence during a grand final.

Chaired by Brendan McCartney, the voters and their choices were as follows:

Teams

Umpires
The umpiring panel for the grand final comprised nine match day umpires and three emergencies. Among the umpires were four grand final debutants: field umpire Mathew Nicholls, boundary umpires Michael Marantelli and Michael Saunders, and goal umpire Adam Wojcik.

Numbers in brackets represent the number of grand finals umpired; this number includes 2013 and does not include times selected as an emergency umpire.

Scorecard

Tribunal
The following Monday, the Match Review Panel adjudicated on two offences incurred by Hawthorn's Brian Lake and Cyril Rioli, both of which carried the double points loading of due to being incurred during a grand final. The third offence of misconduct against Fremantle's Nick Suban was referred directly to the Tribunal for assessment, which determined the incident was improper but not grievous. Suban pleaded guilty to the incident and apologized for what he felt to be an accident.

See also
 2013 NAB Cup
 2013 AFL season
 2013 AFL finals series

References

VFL/AFL Grand Finals
Grand Final
Hawthorn Football Club
Fremantle Football Club